Nathan Kahan (born 12 February 1971 in Antwerp) is a Belgian retired middle-distance runner who specialised in the 800 metres. He represented his country at the 2000 Summer Olympics, as well as two World Championships. His best result came early in his career when he narrowly missed the final at the 1993 World Championships in Stattgart.

His personal bests in the event are 1:44.96 outdoors (Nuremberg 1997) and 1:47.93 indoors (Karlsruhe 1998).

Kahan now works as a sport psychologist.

International competitions

References

1971 births
Living people
Belgian male middle-distance runners
Olympic athletes of Belgium
Athletes (track and field) at the 2000 Summer Olympics
Sportspeople from Antwerp